Marius Thorp (born 28 June 1988) is a Norwegian professional golfer.

Career
Thorp had a successful amateur career, winning the European Amateur in 2005 and claiming the silver medal for lowest amateur in the 2006 Open Championship. He turned professional in 2007 and had immediate success, claiming four wins on mini-tours in Scandinavia. In 2010 Thorp joined the Challenge Tour and found further success at that level, with six top-10s in his debut season. He ended 2010 16th in the standings, which earned him a European Tour card for 2011.

In September 2011 he announced that he was taking a break from golf, saying that his motivation and desire were no longer present.

Thorp hails from Bærum and represented the local golf club Bærum GK.

Amateur wins
2005 European Amateur

Professional wins (5)

Nordic Golf League wins (4)

1Co-sanctioned by the Hi5 Pro Tour

Hi5 Pro Tour wins (2)

1Co-sanctioned by the Nordic Golf League

Results in major championships

LA = Low amateur
"T" = tied
Note: Thorp only played in The Open Championship.

Team appearances
Amateur
 Junior Ryder Cup (representing Europe): 2004 (winners)
 European Boys' Team Championship (representing Norway): 2003, 2004, 2005, 2006 (winners)
Jacques Léglise Trophy (representing Continental Europe): 2005 (winners), 2006 (winners)
Eisenhower Trophy (representing Norway): 2006
Bonallack Trophy (representing Europe): 2006 (winners)
European Amateur Team Championship (representing Norway): 2007

See also
2010 Challenge Tour graduates

References

External links

Norwegian male golfers
European Tour golfers
Sportspeople from Oslo
Sportspeople from Bærum
1988 births
Living people